Jess Foley may refer to:

Jess Foley (writer)
Jess Foley (sportswoman)

See also
Jess Folley, singer